This list of Jewish economists includes economists who are or were verifiably Jewish or of Jewish descent.

A-G 

 Albert Aftalion, Bulgarian-born French economist
 George Akerlof, Nobel Prize (2001)
 Joshua Angrist, Nobel Prize (2021)
 Kenneth Arrow, Nobel Prize (1972)
 Robert Aumann, Nobel Prize (2005)
 Lord Bauer, economist
 Gary Becker, Nobel Prize (1992)
 Yoram Ben-Porat (died 1992), Israeli economist and president of the Hebrew University of Jerusalem
 Ben Bernanke, economist and former Chairman of the Federal Reserve
 Jared Bernstein
 Mario Blejer, Argentine economist and former President of the Central Bank of Argentina in 2002. 

 Walter Block, Harold E. Wirth Endowed Chair in Economics at Loyola University in New Orleans
 Arthur Burns, economist and former Chairman of the Federal Reserve
 Otto Eckstein, a key developer of the idea of core inflation
 Richard Ehrenberg, economist
 Martin Feldstein, Harvard Professor; Chair of the Council of Economic Advisors in the Reagan Administration
 Robert Fogel, Nobel Prize (1993)
 Milton Friedman, Nobel Prize (1976)
 Barry Goldwater, half-Jewish American economist
 Charles Goodhart, Bank of England economist
 Alan Greenspan, economist and former Chairman of the Federal Reserve

H-L 
 John Harsanyi, Nobel Prize (1994)
 Arnold Heertje, Dutch
 Rudolf Hilferding, Austrian-German marxist economist 
 Leonid Hurwicz, Nobel Prize (2007)
 Richard Kahn, Baron Kahn, economist: multiplier
 Daniel Kahneman, Nobel Prize (2002)
 Leonid Kantorovich, Nobel Prize (1975)
 Henry Hazlitt, half-Jewish Austrian economist  
 Israel Kirzner, economist (UK-born)
 Lawrence Klein, Nobel Prize (1980)
 János Kornai, Hungarian
 Paul Krugman, Nobel Prize (2008)
 Simon Kuznets, Nobel Prize (1971)
 Vladimir Kvint, economist and strategist
 Ludwig Lachmann, economist
 Harold Laski, economist
 Emil Lederer, economist
 Wassily Leontief, Nobel Prize (1973)
 Abba P. Lerner, Russian-born British economist
 Leone Levi, political economist
 Robert Liefmann, economist
 Ephraim Lipson, economic historian
 Adolph Lowe, German
 Rosa Luxemburg, economist, co-founder of the KPD

M-Z 

Stephen Marglin, American 
 Harry Markowitz, Nobel Prize (1990), John von Neumann Theory Prize (1989)
 Karl Marx, inventor of Marxist economics Karl Marx was ethnically Jewish. His maternal grandfather was a Dutch rabbi, while his paternal line had supplied Trier's rabbis since 1723, a role taken by his grandfather Meier Halevi Marx.
 Eric Maskin, Nobel Prize (2007)
 Robert C. Merton, Nobel Memorial Prize in Economic Sciences (1997)
Paul Milgrom, Nobel Prize (2020)
 Merton Miller, Nobel Prize (1990)
 Hyman Minsky, American
Frederic Mishkin, American 
 Noreena Hertz, economist and activist
 Ludwig von Mises, Austrian School 
 Franco Modigliani, Nobel Prize (1985)
 Toby Moskowitz, financial economist, 	Fischer Black Prize (2007)
 Roger Myerson, Nobel Memorial Prize in Economic Sciences (2007)
 William Nordhaus, BBVA Foundation Frontiers of Knowledge Award (2017), Nobel Memorial Prize in Economic Sciences (2018)
 Alexander Nove
 Arthur Melvin Okun, chairman of the Council of Economic Advisers (1968-1969)
Don Patinkin, Israeli 
 Sigbert Prais, economist
 Karl Polanyi, Austrian-Hungarian economist and economic historian
 Roy Radner, American who developed the Radner equilibrium concept
 David Ricardo, economist (converted to Quakerism)
 Alvin E. Roth, Nobel prize (2012)
 Murray Rothbard, Austrian School economist, writer, libertarian, and father of anarcho-capitalism
 Nouriel Roubini, Iranian-American
 Paul Samuelson, Nobel Prize (1970)
 Myron Scholes, Nobel Prize (1997)
 Anna Schwartz, economist who published A Monetary History of the United States, 1867–1960 (1963), which laid a large portion of the blame for the Great Depression at the door of the Federal Reserve System. President of the Western Economic Association International (1988)
 Arthur Seldon, economist
 Herbert A. Simon, Nobel Prize (1978)
 Sir Hans Singer, known for the Prebisch–Singer thesis
 Robert Solow, Nobel Prize (1987)
 Gene Sperling, Director of the National Economic Council (2011-2014)
Piero Sraffa, Italian economist
 Herbert Stein, chairman of the Council of Economic Advisers (1971-1974)
 Joseph Stiglitz, Nobel Prize (2001)
 Lawrence Summers, economist, Treasury Secretary, Harvard President, former Chief Economist at the World Bank, John Bates Clark Medal (1993)
Richard Thaler, Nobel Memorial Prize in Economic Sciences (2017)
 Jacob Viner, Canadian economist
 Leo Wolman, American economist.
 Basil Yamey, South African economist
 Janet Yellen, economist, former chair of the US Federal Reserve Bank

References
 JYB = Jewish Year Book

Footnotes

See also
Lists of Jews
List of Jewish American economists

Economists

Jewish